Jacques Deschamps (March 6, 1697 in Pays de Caux – October 3, 1759, in Dangu) was a French  theologian and priest.

His father, Noel Deschamps, was a village laborer remembered as being honest and hardworking, who died when his son Jacques was only four years old. In 1709, young Jacques was sent to Dieppe to continue the education he had begun in his father's home. From there, he went to Rouen, where he studied philosophy and then theology.

Deschamps was elevated to the priesthood in 1721, taking on a position at Caux that did not accord with his love of study. He was then able to go to Paris to complete the necessary studies to become a Doctor of the Sorbonne.

He then went to a seminary in Paris, where he was able to devote himself to his studies. In 1728, he was appointed parish priest of Dangu, in the diocese of Rouen. He served there for 31 years, until his death.

Deschamps composed a French translation of the Book of Isaiah, published in 1760, which is noted for being rather more free than literal—even to the point of reordering lines and paragraphs. This translation is introduced by three "discourses" of a theological nature.

Deschamps died before being able to publish a similar work on the Psalms, which he had been working on for some years.

He is remembered for his desire to educate the young.

References

External links
 Isaïe vengé : double sens des saintes écritures établi et justifié, rappel futur des juifs réduit à ses justes idées, a 1761 work criticizing Deschamps' interpretation of Isaiah, at Google Books
 

1697 births
1759 deaths
Clergy from Rouen
University of Paris alumni
French non-fiction writers
18th-century French Roman Catholic priests
18th-century French diplomats
French male non-fiction writers